Pyla fusca is a snout moth of the subfamily Phycitinae and inhabits the Holarctic. It is distinct from the other species of the genus Pyla, which are only found in North America, and has been proposed for separation in a monotypic genus Matilella. Considering the insufficient knowledge of Phycitinae, this may be warranted, and eventually relatives of this specimens might be discovered in the Old World, or it  might turn out to be a cryptic species complex. On the other hand, its separation might render Pyla paraphyletic, in which case it would not be warranted. More research is required to resolve this question.

The wingspan is 25–28 mm. The moths are on wing from June to August depending on the location. The larvae feed on Erica and Vaccinium species.

External links
 Microplepidoptera.nl 
 Lepidoptera of Belgium
 UK Moths
 Fauna Europaea

Phycitinae
Moths described in 1811
Moths of Europe
Insects of Iceland
Moths of Japan
Insects of Turkey